

Winners

Records 
 Producer with most awards: Carla Estrada with 8 awards
 Producer with most nominations: Ernesto Alonso with 17 nominations

External links 
TVyNovelas at esmas.com
TVyNovelas Awards at the univision.com

Best Telenovela
Best Telenovela
Best Telenovela